Joe Brolly (born 25 June 1969 Dungiven, County Londonderry, Northern Ireland) is a Gaelic football analyst, former player and barrister who played at senior level for the Derry county team.

Brolly played for Derry in the 1990s and early 2000s and was part of the county's only All-Ireland Senior Football Championship winning side in 1993. He also won two Ulster Senior Football Championships and four National League titles.

Brolly played club football for St Canice's Dungiven for most of his career, before transferring to St Brigid's GAC in Belfast.

He usually played as right corner forward and was renowned for his accurate point-taking, goal-scoring ability, pace and ability to take on opponents. He was also known for his goal celebration of blowing kisses to the crowd, and had his nose broken twice during his career immediately after scoring goals.

After retiring as a player, Brolly fashioned a niche for himself in television punditry, most prominently with RTÉ on The Sunday Game until 2019.

Early and family life
Brolly is the son of noted traditional singer and Limavady Sinn Féin councillor Anne Brolly. His father Francie, also a traditional musician, played Gaelic football for Derry in the 1960s, and was later a Sinn Féin councillor and MLA.

Joe Brolly is a first cousin of Derry player Liam Hinphey and Monaghan player Vincent Corey, and second cousin to Tyrone footballers Colm and Plunkett Donaghy. He is from Dungiven, County Londonderry, Northern Ireland.

Brolly boarded in Saint Patrick's Grammar School, Armagh where he played basketball for Ireland as a schoolboy. After school he progressed to Trinity College Dublin to read law, before doing a postgraduate course at Queen's University Belfast. He was a prominent member of the Dublin University Central Athletic Club (DUCAC) in his Trinity days, and became a member of the student executive.

Brolly married podcaster and radio presenter Laurita Blewitt at the Ice House Hotel in County Mayo in August 2022.

Playing career

County
Brolly made his Derry Senior debut against Cavan in the 1990 National League. In 1993 he was part of the Derry side that won the Ulster Championship and the county's first All-Ireland Senior Football Championship. His All Stars Award recognition surprisingly came in the relatively barren years of 1996 and 1997. He was top scorer in the 1997 Ulster Championship with 3–15 (24 points). Brolly added a second Ulster Senior Football Championship in 1998, in the final of which he scored the clinching goal in the last minute. Derry won the National Football League four times in a nine-year period from 1992 to 2000 (1992, 1995, 1996, 2000), with Brolly being part of all four. Brolly and Derry finished runners-up to Offaly in the 1998 National League decider.

Club
As a 21-year-old, Brolly was part of Dungiven's Derry Senior Football Championship success in 1991. Brolly won another Derry Championship medal in 1997, and also won the Ulster Club Championship. He was top scorer in that year's Derry Championship with 1–25 (28 points) and was man of the match in the final at Celtic Park.

He played for St Brigid's GAC in Belfast when it won the Antrim Intermediate Football Championship. In 2006 St Brigid's became the first GAA club to play against the Police Service of Northern Ireland Gaelic football team. In 2009 Brolly broke his leg while playing in a challenge match against Cookstown. St Brigid's reached that year's Antrim Senior Football Championship semi-final, but were defeated after a replay by a point by Portglenone.

College
It was in the Sigerson Cup that Joe Brolly first appeared on the national stage. He won his only inter-varsity medal in 1992, as a member of Queen's victorious Ryan Cup team.

Hurling
Brolly played hurling for local club Kevin Lynch's when they won Division 2 of the All-Ireland Féile na nGael in 1982.

Coaching career
Brolly helped out with the Antrim team that finished runners-up in the 2007 Tommy Murphy Cup and winners of the 2008 competition.

Other work
Brolly writes a column for Gaelic Life and the Sunday Independent. A radio and television football pundit, he is a former regular on the long-running RTÉ programme The Sunday Game. Keith Duggan, writing in The Irish Times, described Brolly as "the most lippy and articulate pundit on Irish television". In 2012, he was dubbed "the Salman Rushdie of County Mayo".

As a barrister he has specialised in criminal matters and has defended Irish republicans in court.

He appeared as Counsel in a UK Supreme Court case in 2011 that established a right to compensation for a miscarriage of justice without the requirement to prove the innocence of the wrongly convicted person (in this instance the Derry republicans Eamonn McDermott and Raymond McCartney).

Career statistics

Honours

County
 All-Ireland Senior Football Championship (1): 1993
 National Football League (4): 1992, 1995, 1996, 2000
 Ulster Senior Football Championship (2): 1993, 1998
 Dr McKenna Cup  (2): 1993, 1999

Club
 Ulster Senior Club Football Championship (1): 1997
 Derry Senior Football Championship (2): 1991, 1997
 Derry Senior Football League (2): 1990, 1991

College
 Ryan Cup (1): 1992

Individual
 All Stars Award (2): 1996, 1997

References

External links

 Interview

1969 births
Living people
Alumni of Queen's University Belfast
Derry inter-county Gaelic footballers
Dual players
Dungiven Gaelic footballers
Gaelic games writers and broadcasters
Barristers from Northern Ireland
Kevin Lynch's hurlers
People educated at St Patrick's Grammar School, Armagh
People from Dungiven
Sunday Independent (Ireland) people
20th-century people from Northern Ireland
21st-century people from Northern Ireland
Winners of one All-Ireland medal (Gaelic football)